Synona obscura, is a species of lady beetle found in India and Sri Lanka.

Description
Body length is about 5.1 to 6.8 mm. Body broad, and subcircular. Head and pronotum are uniform bright yellowish orange in color, whereas elytra is black. Ventrum tinged with yellowish orange color, but the elytral epipleura is black. Apical margin of last antennal segment is obliquely truncate. Pronotum densely punctate. Elytral punctures are much finer than pronotal punctures.  Elytral epipleura is broad.

Biology
It is a predator of several aphids and mealybugs such as, Coptosoma ostensum, Megacopta cribraria, and Aphis craccivora. Host plants include: Butea monosperma, Lablab purpureus, Cajanus cajan, Sesbania grandiflora, Santalum album, Trichosanthes cucumerina, Brassica oleracea, Anacardium occidentale, and Trewia.

Larvae occasionally parasitized by Nothoserphus mirabilis and Homalotylus flaminius.

References 

Coccinellidae
Insects of Sri Lanka
Beetles described in 1866